You Fell Victim (Russian: Вы жертвою пали; Vy zhertvoiu pali), or You Fell Victim to a Fateful Struggle, is a Russian Marxist and revolutionary funeral march. It acted as the funeral dirge of the Russian revolutionary movement, among them the Bolsheviks.

The song was written in 1878; the lyrics were written by Anton Arkhangelsky, and the musical arrangements were made by Nikolay Ikonikov.

During the funeral of the Bolshevik Nikolay Bauman, a student orchestra joined the procession near the St. Petersburg Conservatory, playing "You Fell Victim to a Fateful Struggle" repeatedly.

The melody of "You Fell A Victim" was used by Dmitri Shostakovich in the third part of his Symphony No. 11; it had since the end of the 19th century often been the funeral march of Russian revolutionaries. The same melody was used in Edmund Meisel's score for Sergei Eisenstein's Battleship Potemkin, in the scene of the funeral of Grigory Vakulinchuk.

The melody also forms the basis of the 1936 composition "Russian Funeral" by Benjamin Britten, scored for brass and percussion.

References

Bibliography

Soviet music
Russian music
Bolsheviks
Russian Revolution
Songs about revolutions
Funerary and memorial compositions
1878 songs